This is a list of flag bearers who have represented South Africa at the Olympics.

Flag bearers carry the national flag of their country at the opening ceremony of the Olympic Games.

See also
South Africa at the Olympics

References

South Africa at the Olympics
South Africa
Olympic flagbearers